This is a list of tribute albums dedicated to American singer-songwriter Madonna. Since her debut in the 1980s, diverse artists have made tribute albums to the singer. While she is primarily a pop, dance and electronic artist, her tribute albums have been covered with a wide-range of different genres and styles, including instrumental, jazz, children's music and easy listening. 

Some artists who have appeared on these albums ranging from Royal Philharmonic Orchestra, Mad'House, and Ariel Pink to The Tyde, Chapin Sisters and Lavender Diamond. Releases have been through major labels such as Universal Music Group and Columbia Records to independent labels such as Cleopatra Records, Cherry Red Records and Manimal Vinyl among others.

Various of the Madonna tribute albums have been reviewed by music critics, receiving both positive or negative comments. Notable releases include to Glee: The Music, The Power of Madonna (2010), Through the Wilderness (2007) and Rockabye Baby! Lullaby Renditions of Madonna (2011) by the series of CDs Rockabye Baby!. In 2011, Paper Bag Records made a remake of her third studio album, True Blue, while Charly Records have released a series of Madonna tribute albums.

Tribute albums

See also
Madonna, an album of covers in Hindi-language from Alisha Chinai
List of cover versions of Madonna songs, a selected list of covers versions of her songs

References

External links

 
Lists of tribute albums
Cultural depictions of Madonna